

79001–79100 

|-id=086
| 79086 Gorgasali || 1977 RD || Vakhtang I of Iberia (440–502) ruler of the Georgian kingdom of Kartli and founder of Tbilisi || 
|-id=087
| 79087 Scheidt ||  || Samuel Scheidt (1587–1654), a German organist and composer, who was born and died in the discoverer's home town, Halle, Saxony-Anhalt || 
|}

79101–79200 

|-id=117
| 79117 Brydonejack ||  || William Brydone Jack (1817–1886) was a pioneer of Canadian astronomy. He built British North America's first astronomical observatory in 1851. Jack practised public outreach in astronomy. He determined Canada's first longitude readings, delivered the first engineering lecture and created the first engineering chair in Canada. || 
|-id=129
| 79129 Robkoldewey ||  || Robert Koldewey (1855–1925), a German architect and archaeologist || 
|-id=130
| 79130 Bandanomori ||  || Mount Bandanomori (769 m), in Suzaki city, Kochi prefecture, Japan || 
|-id=138
| 79138 Mansfeld ||  || Mansfeld is a German town, situated at the border of the Harz Mountains. || 
|-id=144
| 79144 Cervantes ||  || Miguel de Cervantes (1547–1616), Spanish novelist, best known for Don Quijote || 
|-id=149
| 79149 Kajigamori ||  || Mount Kajigamori (1400 m), in Otoyo town, Kochi prefecture, Japan, site of Kajigamori Observatory  || 
|-id=152
| 79152 Abukumagawa ||  || The Japanese Abukumagawa River originates in Mt. Kashi-Asahidake. It runs south to north through Fukushima and Miyagi prefectures, winding its way through the major cities in central Fukushima prefecture, before flowing into the Pacific Ocean. || 
|}

79201–79300 

|-id=240
| 79240 Rosanna || 1994 QD || Rosanna Spessot (born 1958), an Italian amateur astronomer, who is one of the most important staff members on the Farra d'Isonzo Observatory team. || 
|-id=241
| 79241 Fulviobressan || 1994 QE || Fulvio Bressan (born 1956), an Italian amateur astronomer, who was one of the founders of the Farra d'Isonzo Observatory. || 
|-id=254
| 79254 Tsuda || 1994 YJ || Tsunemi Tsuda (1960–1993), the "Blazing Closer", Japanese baseball player for the Hiroshima Toyo Carp || 
|-id=271
| 79271 Bellagio ||  || The Italian resort town of Bellagio on Lake Como, a few kilometers north of the Sormano Astronomical Observatory where this asteroid was discovered (Src) || 
|-id=286
| 79286 Hexiantu ||  || He Xiantu (born 1937) is a leading theoretical physicist and an Academician of the Chinese Academy of Sciences. He has made significant contributions to the studies of plasma physics, nonlinear science and statistical physics. He has won several State Natural Science Awards and National Science and Technology Progress Awards. || 
|}

79301–79400 

|-id=316
| 79316 Huangshan ||  || Huangshan City, named for nearby Huangshan mountain range, is the birthplace of Huizhou culture. There is beautiful natural scenery, human relics and rare natural resources that have allowed the city to be identified for UNESCO World Cultural and Natural Heritage in the World Heritage List || 
|-id=333
| 79333 Yusaku ||  || Yūsaku Matsuda, 20th-century Japanese television and film actor || 
|-id=347
| 79347 Medlov ||  || Medlov is a pond located near the town of Nové Město na Moravě in the Bohemian-Moravian Highlands, Czech Republic. It is a popular recreational area. Astronomical summer youth camps were organized near Medlov pond in the 1980s and 1990s. || 
|-id=353
| 79353 Andrewalday ||  || Andrew Alday, American member of the Air Force Maui Optical and Supercomputing (AMOS) team || 
|-id=354
| 79354 Brundibár || 1997 BB || Brundibár is a children's opera by Jewish Czech composer Hans Krása and librettist Adolf Hoffmeister, originally performed by the children of Theresienstadt ghetto for Jews in 1943. The name comes from a Czech word for a bumble-bee. || 
|-id=360
| 79360 Sila-Nunam ||  || Silap Inua (Sila) is the Inuit god of the sky, weather, and life force. Nunam is the Earth goddess, Sila's wife. || 
|-id=375
| 79375 Valetti || 1997 FA || Alvero Valetti (1923–2005), an Italian mathematician and physicist || 
|}

79401–79500 

|-id=410
| 79410 Wallerius ||  || Johan Gottschalk Wallerius (1709–1785), a Swedish chemist and mineralogist, who was the first holder (from 1750) of a professorship in chemistry, medicine and pharmacy at Uppsala University. He is considered the founder of agricultural chemistry. In 1761 he published his main work, Agriculturae fundamenta chemica || 
|-id=418
| 79418 Zhangjiajie || 1997 LO || Zhangjiajie, Hunan province, China, one of eight UNESCO-listed Chinese geoparks. || 
|-id=419
| 79419 Gaolu || 1997 MZ || Gaolu (1877–1947), the pioneer of modern astronomy in China, was born in Changle city, China Fujian province. He initiated the foundation of the Chinese Astronomical Society and the Purple Mountain Observatory in Nanjing || 
|-id=472
| 79472 Chiorny ||  || Vasilij G. Chiorny (born 1953), Ukrainian astronomer and asteroid photometrist who has discovered several binary asteroids at the Kharkiv Observatory  || 
|}

79501–79600 

|-bgcolor=#f2f2f2
| colspan=4 align=center | 
|}

79601–79700 

|-id=641
| 79641 Daniloceirani ||  || Danilo Ceirani (born 1964) is an industrial chemist and Italian history writer, who has published several books on Roman history, Napoleon and World War II. || 
|-id=647
| 79647 Ballack ||  || Michael Ballack (born 1976) is a German professional footballer. Ballack began his career as a youth footballer at his local team at Chemnitz (about 20 km north of Drebach) and made his professional debut in 1995 || 
|-id=694
| 79694 Nanrendong ||  || Nan Rendong (1945–2017) was a leading astronomer, Vice-President and President of IAU Division X (2003–2009). Hailed as 'Father of the Five-hundred-meter Aperture Spherical radio Telescope (FAST)', he led the efforts from initiation, implementation, to completion of FAST, and served as Chief Scientist and Chief Engineer. || 
|}

79701–79800 

|-bgcolor=#f2f2f2
| colspan=4 align=center | 
|}

79801–79900 

|-id=811
| 79811 Fengzikai ||  || Feng Zikai (1898–1975) was a famous painter, essayist, and art and music educator in modern China. His unique style of caricature and prose was very popular. || 
|-id=826
| 79826 Finardi ||  || Eugenio Finardi (born 1952), a famous Italian blues and pop rock singer. || 
|-id=847
| 79847 Colzani ||  || Enrico Colzani (born 1956), an Italian amateur astronomer, discoverer of minor planets, and member of the Gruppo Astrofili Brianza, who has been popularizing and teaching astronomy, and who is keen to establish a planetarium near the Sormano Astronomical Observatory. || 
|-id=864
| 79864 Pirituba ||  || Pirituba, a neighborhood in São Paulo, Brazil. Its name derives from the Tupi language words "piri" (a type of marshland plant) and "tuba" (meaning "many"). || 
|-id=889
| 79889 Maloka ||  || The Maloka Interactive Center of Science and Technology, an interactive science museum in Bogota, Colombia. || 
|-id=896
| 79896 Billhaley ||  || Bill Haley (1925–1981), American rock-and-roll pioneer || 
|-id=900
| 79900 Coreglia ||  || The Italian town of Coreglia Antelminelli, situated in the Valley of the Serchio River in the heart of Tuscany. The ancient medieval town is considered one of the most beautiful villages of Italy and is known throughout the world for its artistic production of plaster figurines. || 
|}

79901–80000 

|-id=912
| 79912 Terrell ||  || Dirk Terrell (born 1965), American astronomer, author and astronomical artist || 
|-id=991
| 79991 Umbertoleotti ||  || Umberto Leotti (born 1952) was an architect, who from 1973 to 1975 attended the S. Vittore Observatory (Bologna) with the aim of starting research activity on minor planets. He made contact with P. Herget to receive the Minor Planet Circulars and with G. A. Chebotarev to receive the annual volume of the Ephemerides of Minor Planets. || 
|-id=996
| 79996 Vittoria ||  || Vittoria Colombini (born 2021) is the second son of Alberto Colombini (see ) and Elena Cuoghi, and grandson of Italian amateur astronomer Ermes Colombini at the San Vittore Observatory where this minor planet was discovered. || 
|}

References 

079001-080000